Alsemberg is a rural town with about 5,300 inhabitants in the municipality of Beersel, in the province of Flemish Brabant, Belgium, situated south of Brussels.

The official language is Dutch (as everywhere in Flanders). Located close to Brussels, to Wallonia and the municipality with linguistic facilities of Sint-Genesius-Rode, Alsemberg is home to a minority of French-speakers.

External link

Populated places in Flemish Brabant